SU Andromedae is a carbon star in the constellation of Andromeda.  It is a variable star classified as a slow irregular pulsating supergiant, and varies from an apparent visual magnitude of 8.5 at minimum brightness to a magnitude of 8.0 at maximum brightness with no clear period.

Variability

Thomas Espin noted the possible variability of this star in 1895. Williamina Fleming, in 1906, was examining photographic plates taken for the purpose of creating the Henry Draper Catalogue when she independently discovered and confirmed it as a variable star.

Spectrum
The spectrum of SU Andromedae is dominated by Swan bands from the molecule C2.  These stars were classified as type N under the Harvard scheme, stars with the blue continuum completely obscured by molecular absorption bands.  Carbon star spectral types were later refined in the Morgan-Keenan system and SU Andromedae was typically classified as C64, indicating a fairly cool carbon star and the subscript 4 showing modest Swan band intensity.

Under the modern revised Morgan-Keenan system, SU Andromedae is classified as C-N5 C26-.  The C-N spectral type is to distinguish those stars from the C-R type where the blue continuum is not entirely hidden by absorption bands.  A classification based on the infrared spectrum is C5 II, again a moderately cool carbon star with a luminosity class of II for a bright giant.

Companion
SU Andromedae is 22" from a magnitude 12.77 star, probably an F0 main sequence star. It has an almost identical space motion as SU Andromedae and is assumed to be a distant co-moving companion. Based on that assumption, the absolute magnitude of SU Andromedae is calculated to be about −2.2.

References

Semiregular variable stars
Andromeda (constellation)
225217
Carbon stars
Andromedae, SU
000363
Slow irregular variables
Durchmusterung objects